Sergiyenko is a surname of Ukrainian origin. Other transliterations include Serhiyenko, Serhienko, Serhiienko, Sergeyenko, and Sergeenko. 

Notable people with the surname include:
 Davit Sergeenko (born 1963), Georgian physician and healthcare manager
 Leonid Serhienko (born 1955), Ukrainian politician
 Mariya Sergeyenko (1891–1987), Soviet historian
 Ulyana Sergeenko (born 1979), Russian fashion designer
 Yuriy Sergiyenko (born 1965), Ukrainian athlete

Ukrainian-language surnames
Patronymic surnames
Surnames from given names